Mickey Mouse Mixed-Up Adventures, formerly known as Mickey and the Roadster Racers, is an American computer-animated  preschool television series on Disney Junior. Produced by Disney Television Animation, it is the successor to Mickey Mouse Clubhouse. The series debuted on Disney Junior and Disney Channel in the United States on January 15, 2017, and ended on October 1, 2021.

The series was renewed for a second season on March 15, 2017, which premiered on April 13, 2018. A third season began airing on October 14, 2019, under the new title Mickey Mouse Mixed-Up Adventures.

Series overview

Episodes

Season 1: Mickey and the Roadster Racers (2017–18)

Season 2: Super-Charged (2018–19)

Season 3: Mickey Mouse Mixed-Up Adventures (2019–21)
Starting this season, in several episodes, Kaitlyn Robrock takes over as the voice of Minnie Mouse following Russi Taylor's death in July 2019.

Shorts

Shorts overview

Chip 'N Dale's Nutty Tales

Season 1 (2017)

Season 2 (2018–19)

Mickey Mouse: Hot Diggity-Dog Tales

References

Lists of American children's animated television series episodes